Bríd Gordon is a camogie player, winner of an All-Ireland Senior medal in 2010,2011 and 2012. She was born in Cornamona.

Other awards
National Camogie League medals in 2010 and 2011; Division two 2009.

References

External links
 Camogie.ie Official Camogie Association Website
 Wexford Wexford camogie site

Living people
Wexford camogie players
Year of birth missing (living people)